Ph'lip Side is an album by guitarist Phil Keaggy, released in 1980 on Sparrow Records. To date, it is the only Phil Keaggy release to feature a double-sided cover image, in order to visually convey the "acoustic" and "electric" sides of the album. Corresponding song tracks are listed alongside each image.

Track listing
All songs written by Phil Keaggy, unless otherwise noted.

This side (acoustic)
 "A Child (In Everyone's Heart)"  – 4:01
 "Little Ones"  – 4:58
 "Spend My Life With You"  – 5:16
 "Just a Moment Away"  (Keaggy, Doug Pinnick) – 4:04
 "I Belong to You" - 3:27

That side (electric)
 "A Royal Commandment"  – 5:46
 "Sunday School"  – 4:34
 "Send Out Your Light" (Keaggy, Ted Sandquist) – 3.:28
 "Pulling Down" (Keaggy, Greg X. Volz) – 5:26

Note: The 1980 release use the above track order. The 1982 reissue, and subsequent CD release, removes "Send Out Your Light" and adds "In Your Keep" and shuffles the track order.

Personnel
 Phil Keaggy – acoustic and electric guitars, vocals
 Paul Leim – drums
 Leon Gaer – electric synthesized bass
 Richard Souther – piano, Rhodes, and synthesizers
 Alex Acuña – percussion
 Dan Collins – background vocals
 Greg X. Volz – background vocals
 Jamie Owens-Collins – background vocals
 Matthew Ward – background vocals

Production notes
 Produced by Dan Collins and Phil Keaggy
 Engineered by Jack Joseph Puig
 Recorded at Sound Labs, Hollywood, California, Martinsound Studios, Alhambra, California, Sound City Studios, Van Nuys, California, Smoketree Studios, Chatsworth, California
 Mixed at Sound Labs, Hollywood, California
 Mastered at Mastering Labs, Hollywood, California

References

1980 albums
Phil Keaggy albums
Albums recorded at Sound City Studios